Fred Rhoda House, also known as Cottrell House and Goldie Dickerson House, is a historic home located at La Grange, Lewis County, Missouri. It was built about 1854, and is a two-story, central-bay brick I-house with some Greek Revival styling.  It has a one-story brick rear ell with frame addition.

It was listed on the National Register of Historic Places in 1999.

References

Houses on the National Register of Historic Places in Missouri
Greek Revival houses in Missouri
Houses completed in 1854
Buildings and structures in Lewis County, Missouri
National Register of Historic Places in Lewis County, Missouri